Gonzalo Armando de la Carrera Correa (born 13 January 1962) is a Chilean politician who was elected as deputy (member of parliament) on 21 November 2021. Militant of the conservative Republican Party, he considers himself as liberal inside José Antonio Kast's party. Similarly, he was a militant of Evópoli, party from which he resigned in 2019.

He was CEO of La Polar and vice-president of the ENAP.

References

External links
 

Living people
Evópoli politicians
Republican Party (Chile, 2019) politicians
21st-century Chilean politicians
Chilean anti-communists
1962 births